The following are the accolades received by American filmmaker Richard Linklater.

Accolades

References 

Linklater, Richard, list of awards and nominations received by
Linklater, Richard, list of awards and nominations received by